Face Off is an American reality television game show on the Syfy cable network in which a group of prosthetic makeup artists compete against each other to create prostheses such as those found in science fiction and horror films. 

Face Off premiered January 26, 2011 on Syfy. As of August 7, 2018, 160 episodes of Face Off have aired.

Series overview

Episode list

Season 1 (2011)

Season 2 (2012)

Season 3 (2012)

Season 4 (2013)

Season 5 (2013)

Season 6 (2014)

Season 7 (2014)

Season 8 (2015)

Season 9 (2015)

Season 10 (2016)

Season 11 (2017)

Season 12 (2017)

Season 13 (2018)

References

External links
 

Face Off (U.S. TV series) 
Face Off (TV series)